Frank Phillipson was a male athlete who competed for England.

Athletics career
He competed for England in the pole vault at the 1934 British Empire Games in London.

Phillipson represented Salford Harriers  and was the 1934 AAA champion.

References

English male pole vaulters
Athletes (track and field) at the 1934 British Empire Games
Commonwealth Games competitors for England